Cirencester Abbey or St Mary's Abbey, Cirencester in Gloucestershire was founded as an Augustinian monastery in 1117 on the site of an earlier church, the oldest-known Saxon church in England, which had itself been built on the site of a Roman structure. The church was greatly enlarged in the 14th century with addition of an ambulatory to the east end. The abbot became mitred 1416. The monastery was suppressed in 1539 and presented to Roger Bassinge.

In the twelfth and thirteenth centuries, the abbey fostered the successful writers Robert of Cricklade and Alexander Neckam. They were supported in their work by other canons, including Walter of Mileto and Alexander's nephew Geoffrey Brito.

Burials 
Regenbald
Thomas Holland, 1st Duke of Surrey and wife Joan Stafford (daughter of Hugh Stafford, 2nd Earl of Stafford)

Post dissolution 
A house called Abbey House was built on the site in the late 16th century, remodelled in the 1780s, and then demolished in 1964 to be replaced by a block of flats. The area that contained the nucleus of the monastery is now a public park, and only the Norman Arch, an original gateway to the abbey, and parts of the precinct wall remain above ground.

The impressive and substantial three-storey porch of the parish church was built as an administrative building of the abbey and after 1539 the upper levels were used for some time as the town hall.

Bibliography
 
 
 
 
 
 
 
 
 
 
 
 
 
 
Victoria County History, Gloucestershire, Vol.2, 1907, pp.79-84, The Abbey of Cirencester
 New, Anthony. A Guide to the Abbeys of England and Wales. London: Constable. pp. 113–114.
 Platt, Colin. The Travellers Guide to Medieval England. London: Secker & Warburg. pp. 110–112.

References 

Monasteries in Gloucestershire
Augustinian monasteries in England
Religious organizations established in the 1110s
Christian monasteries established in the 12th century
Cirencester
1117 establishments in England
1539 disestablishments in England
Monasteries dissolved under the English Reformation